Jamaica competed at the 1992 Summer Olympics in Barcelona, Spain. 36 competitors, 22 men and 14 women, took part in 23 events in 5 sports.

Medalists

Competitors
The following is the list of number of competitors in the Games.

Athletics

Men's 100 metres
Ray Stewart
 Heat — 10.61
 Quarterfinals — 10.36
 Semifinals — 10.33
 Final — 10.22 (→ 7th place)

Men's 200 metres
Clive Wright
 Heat — 20.98
 Quarterfinals — 20.70
 Semifinals — 20.82 (→ did not advance)

Men's 400 metres
Devon Morris
 Heat — 46.45
 Quarterfinals — 45.67 (→ did not advance)

Dennis Blake
 Heat — 45.92
 Quarterfinals — 46.49 (→ did not advance)

Anthony Wallace
 Heat — 46.88 (→ did not advance)

Men's 800 metres
Clive Terrelonge
 Heat — 1:46.64
 Semifinals — 1:51.03 (→ did not advance)

Men's 4 × 100 m Relay
Michael Green, Rudolph Mighty, Anthony Wallace, and Ray Stewart
 Heat — DNF (→ did not advance)

Men's 4 × 400 m Relay
Dennis Blake, Devon Morris, Howard Davis, and Patrick O'Connor
 Heat — DSQ (→ did not advance)

Men's 110m Hurdles
 Richard Bucknor
 Heats — 13.91
 Quarterfinals — 14.22 (→ did not advance)

 Anthony Knight
 Heats — 14.12 (→ did not advance)

Men's 400m Hurdles
Winthrop Graham
 Heat — 48.51
 Semifinal — 47.62
 Final — 47.66 (→  Silver Medal)

Mark Thompson
 Heat — DSQ (→ did not advance)

Women's 100 metres
Juliet Cuthbert
Merlene Ottey
Dahlia Duhaney

Women's 200 metres
Juliet Cuthbert
Merlene Ottey
Grace Jackson

Women's 400 metres
Sandie Richards
Juliet Campbell
Claudine Williams

Women's 100m Hurdles
Gillian Russell
Dionne Rose
Michelle Freeman

Women's 400m Hurdles
Deon Hemmings
 Heat — 55.48
 Semifinal — 54.70
 Final — 55.58 (→ 7th place)

Women's 4 × 100 m Relay
Michelle Freeman, Juliet Cuthbert, Dahlia Duhaney, and Merlene Ottey

Women's 4 × 400 m Relay
Catherine Pomales-Scott, Cathy Rattray-Williams, Juliet Campbell, Sandie Richards, and Claudine Williams

Women's Long Jump
 Dionne Rose
 Heat — 6.22 m (→ did not advance)

 Diane Guthrie-Gresham
 Heat — NM (→ did not advance)

Boxing

Men's Light Flyweight (– 48 kg)
 St. Aubyn Hines
 First Round — Lost to Pramuansak Phosuwan (THA), RSC-2

Men's Lightweight (– 60 kg)
 Delroy Leslie
 First Round — Lost to Shigeyuki Dobashi (JPN), 5:11

Cycling

Three male cyclists represented Jamaica in 1992.

Men's road race
Michael McKay
Arthur Tenn

Men's sprint
Andrew Myers

Men's 1 km time trial
Andrew Myers

Sailing

Men's Two Person Dinghy
Andrew Gooding and Robert Quinton

Table tennis

Men's singles
Michael Hyatt

See also
 Jamaica at the 1990 Commonwealth Games
 Jamaica at the 1991 Pan American Games
 Jamaica at the 1994 Commonwealth Games

References

External links
Official Olympic Reports
International Olympic Committee results database

Nations at the 1992 Summer Olympics
1992
Olympics